Mano a Mano may refer to:

 Mano a Mano (Grupo Bryndis album)
 Mano a Mano (Silvio Rodríguez and Luis Eduardo Aute album)
 "Mano a Mano" (song), a 2018 song by Salvador Sobral
 Mano-A-Mano, a professional boxing event between Manny Pacquiao and Óscar Larios

See also 
 Mano Mano (disambiguation)